So Long Sucker is a board game invented in 1950 by Mel Hausner, John Nash, Lloyd Shapley, and Martin Shubik. It is a four-person bargaining/economic strategy game. Each player begins the game with seven chips, and in the course of play, attempts to acquire all the other players' chips. This requires making agreements with the other players, which are ultimately unenforceable. To win, players must eventually go back on such agreements. The game takes approximately 60 minutes to play.

Rules 
The rules are as follows:
 Starting a game:
 Four players are required.
 Each player takes seven chips of one color (so that each player has their own distinct color), and all chips must remain visible at all times.
 One player is randomly selected as the first player to move.
 Playing the game:
 If a player has a chip that is not their color, it is referred to as their prisoner.
 Players move by playing one of their chips of any color (due to capturing prisoners) onto the playing area, starting a new pile, or on top of any existing chip(s) in the playing area.
 There are three possible outcomes:
 If the top two chips are the same color, they are captured. The player of the color corresponding to the color the capture was made with removes one of the chips from the game and takes the remaining chips, then they take the next move.
 If a color is missing from the pile, the player selects the next person to move, as long as that player does not have a color in the pile.
 If all four colors are in the pile, the player who's top chip is furthest down in the stack is the next player to move.
 If a player is unable to move, they become defeated and are unable to move for the remainder of the game. The move returns to the player who gave the defeated player the move. If this should also defeat that player in turn, whoever gave that player the move will get the next turn, etc.
 Prisoners may be transferred or removed from the game at any time, including immediately before a player is defeated, potentially allowing them to move, and stopping them from being defeated.
 Deals may be made, but all deals are public and nonbinding.
 A defeated player's chips remain in play, but are ignored when determining order of play. In the case where a capture is made with the defeated player's color, as the defeated player is definitionally unable to move, play rebounds to the player who made the capture.
 Winning the game:
 The winner is the last surviving player (after the others have been defeated).
 A player can win even if they hold no chips and all of their chips have been killed.
 Strategy:
 Coalitions, or agreements to cooperate, are permitted, and may take any form.
 There is no penalty for failure to live up to an agreement.
 Players are freely allowed to confer only at the table during the game–no secret or prior agreements are allowed.

Alternative name 
Nash's original name for the game was Fuck You, Buddy. The first episode of Adam Curtis's documentary The Trap, which looks at Nash's work, is titled "F**K You, Buddy".

References

Board games introduced in 1950
Abstract strategy games